He Jianjun (born 1960 in Beijing ) is a Chinese film director and screenwriter. A graduate of the Beijing Film Academy, He is considered a leading voice in the so-called "Sixth Generation." He is occasionally credited under the name "He Yi."

Career 
He Jianjun began his film career like many of his contemporaries at the Beijing Film Academy, China's premiere film school. Upon graduating in 1990, he began an apprenticeship with some of the Fifth Generation's major figures, notably Zhang Yimou, Chen Kaige, and Tian Zhuangzhuang. He would serve as the assistant director in Zhang's Raise the Red Lantern (1992) and Tian's The Blue Kite, as well as a screenwriter for Chen Kaige's King of the Children (1987), before his debut film, Red Beads, was released in 1993 to strong reviews in the west.  Filmed in only twelve days, Red Beads was based on the experiences of one of He's classmates, who had a psychotic break.

While Red Beads would win a FIPRESCI award in the 1993 International Film Festival Rotterdam, the film also caught the wrath of Chinese censors, who blacklisted He Jianjun in 1994 along with several other prominent filmmakers, including Tian Zhuangzhuang, Wang Xiaoshuai, Wu Wenguang, Zhang Yuan, and Ning Dai.

Because of the blacklisting, He Jianjun had to smuggle out his next film, Postman for post-production.

Filmography

References

External links 

He Jianjun at the Chinese Movie Database

1960 births
Living people
Beijing Film Academy alumni
Film directors from Beijing
Screenwriters from Beijing